Khabardar may refer to:

 Khabardar (TV series), a news show on NDTV India
 Khabardar (film), a 2006 comedy Marathi film

See also
 Khabardaar, an Urdu and Punjabi comedy television show